The 1916 VMI Keydets football team represented the Virginia Military Institute (VMI) in their 26th season of organized football. Led by third-year head coach Frank Gorton, the Keydets went 4–5. After a 3–0 start with three shutout victories, VMI lost five out of their final six games.

Schedule

References

VMI Kdets
VMI Keydets football seasons
VMI Keydets football